Kandis Arianne Westmore (born January 5, 1966) is a United States magistrate judge of the United States District Court for the Northern District of California.

Education
Westmore received her Bachelors of Arts in Psychology from the University of California Berkeley in 1989. In 1997, Westmore obtained her Juris Doctor degree from the University of San Francisco School of Law. During law school, she served as a judicial extern for the Honorable Saundra Brown Armstrong, U.S. District Judge of the U.S. District Court for the Northern District of California.

Career 

Upon graduation from law school, Westmore served as a law clerk for the Contra Costa County Public Defender's Office. She then worked at an Oakland-based boutique law firm specializing in Plaintiff's civil rights litigation.

Oakland City Attorney's Office 

In 1999, Westmore joined the Oakland City Attorney's Office as a Deputy City Attorney, where she worked for thirteen years. During her tenure at the Oakland City Attorney's Office, Westmore litigated drug nuisance abatement and code enforcement cases, and also advised city municipal agencies. At the Oakland City Attorney's Office, Westmore also served as a trial attorney and a law-and-motion attorney in the Litigation Division, where she led both offensive and defensive litigation on behalf of the City of Oakland, California and its employees in various federal and state cases involving labor and employment law, civil rights, inverse condemnation, and personal injury law. For her service to the City of Oakland, Westmore has been recognized by community organizations, elected officials and the City itself.

Federal judicial service 

On February 21, 2012, Westmore was appointed as U.S. Magistrate Judge for the United States District Court for the Northern District of California, serving in the Oakland, California division and taking the place of prior U.S. Magistrate Judge James L. Larson.

Westmore has also served as President-Elect of the Alameda County Bar Association (ACBA) and also volunteered for the ACBA Volunteer Legal Service Corporation's Pro Bono program, where she represented low-income individuals in family lawsuits. She also serves on the Northern District of California's Conviction Alternatives Program (CAP) and its Community Outreach Committee.

Westmore also currently teaches Honors Evidence as an adjunct professor at Golden Gate University School of Law. She has also given a commencement speech for the 2018 graduating class of Saint Mary's College of California.

She is also currently the only sitting African American U.S. Magistrate Judge on the United States District Court for the Northern District of California. Judge Westmore and Judge Donna Ryu are also currently the only two U.S. Magistrate Judges serving in the Oakland Division of the Northern District of California.

Notable rulings 

In December 2019, Westmore denied a motion for summary judgment and ordered the U.S. Department of Labor as well as various Silicon Valley companies such as Oracle, Fitbit, Applied Materials, Gilead Sciences, Synopsys, DocuSign, Agilent Technologies, and Xilinx to disclose staff diversity reports in response to a Freedom of Information Act request filed by Reveal from the Center for Investigative Reporting.

In 2019, Westmore ruled that the federal government, via law enforcement, cannot force suspects to unlock their smartphones with their fingers or with other biometric authorization features such as facial or iris recognition.
 
In 2018, Westmore denied the release of Cole White, the alleged Charlottesville rioter with connections to white supremacist groups.
 
In 2016, the United States Court of Appeals for the Federal Circuit affirmed Westmore's decision to appoint a receiver to satisfy a judgment awarding fees and costs in an underlying patent suit brought by an inventor pro se. Earlier in 2015, the Federal Circuit affirmed Westmore's non-infringement ruling of a patent asserted by that pro se inventor against TSI Incorporated and Lockheed Martin.

References

External links 
The Honorable Kandis A. Westmore, U.S. Magistrate Judge, United States District Court for the Northern District of California
Judge Kandis A. Westmore: Find Opportunities To Contribute To The Cause Of Justice (2018 Saint Mary's College of California Commencement Speech)
Ballotpedia: Judge Kandis Westmore

1966 births
Living people
20th-century American lawyers
21st-century American judges
African-American judges
African-American lawyers
20th-century American women lawyers
California lawyers
People from Alameda County, California
People from Oakland, California
United States magistrate judges
Golden Gate University faculty
UC Berkeley College of Letters and Science alumni
University of San Francisco School of Law alumni
20th-century African-American women
20th-century African-American people
21st-century African-American women
21st-century African-American people
21st-century American women judges